S&S Consolidated Independent School District is a public school district based in Sadler, Texas. The first graduating class from S&S was in 1961.

About 
The district serves the cities of Sadler and Southmayd as well as rural areas in west central Grayson County, and was formed by consolidation of prior districts in 1961.

Though Sadler is the larger of the two towns, the first alphabetically, and the location of the administration building, the "S&S" does not necessarily mean "Sadler and Southmayd" – the district does not state which S stands for which community.

In 2009, the school district was rated "recognized" by the Texas Education Agency.

Schools
S&S Consolidated ISD has a total of three schools - two in Sadler and one in Southmayd.

S&S Consolidated High (Grades 9-12, Sadler)
S&S High won the UIL Current Issues and Events team competition for Class 2A for 15 consecutive years (the streak ended in 2009), winning eight state titles during this time. S&S regained the team title in 2010 and repeated (in a tie with Jim Ned High School) in 2011.  In addition, S&S High has also won team titles in Literary Criticism (2002–2003, 2006–07, 2007–08, and 2008–09) as well as the 2003-04 individual titles in this event.
S&S Consolidated Middle (Grades 5-8, Sadler)
S&S Consolidated Elementary (Grades PK-4, Southmayd)

References

External links
 

School districts in Grayson County, Texas